Brockman Airport  is a former airport located in the Pilbara region at Brockman 2 mine, Western Australia

See also
 List of airports in Western Australia
 Aviation transport in Australia

References

External links
 Airservices Aerodromes & Procedure Charts

Pilbara airports
Defunct airports in Western Australia
Rio Tinto Iron Ore